Cracked Ice is a 1938 Warner Bros. Merrie Melodies cartoon directed by Frank Tashlin. The short was released on September 10, 1938.

Plot
A black bird is ice skating over barrels until it trips on one and falls into a hole. A pig named Mr. Squeal (based on W.C. Fields) is ice skating with a cigar until it hears the bird cry for help. Soon, they both start calling for assistance. A Saint Bernard comes out of its doghouse, putting on a sign reading "Gone with the gin", and assists with the cries for help. The Saint Bernard gets out the bird (which is frozen solid in an ice cube) and thaws the bird out. The dog gives it a margarita and the bird warms up. Mr. Squeal is jealous and pretends to drown. The Saint Bernard makes a margarita but gives it to himself. Mr. Squeal trades barbs with a heckler that sounds like Edgar Bergen's ventriloquist dummy Charlie McCarthy.   Mr. Squeal then attempts to trick the Saint Bernard by using a magnet to attack a bowl of bones but the dog crashes into Mr. Squeal and the magnet hits a fish. The margarita comes out of the dog's barrel and the fish drinking it, only to get drunk. The fish swims around doing weird activities when the magnet attacks the roller skates on Mr. Squeal. The fish soon leads Mr. Squeal to an ice skating contest. The fish makes Mr. Squeal do amazing tricks. The judge declares Mr. Squeal is the winner of the ice skating contest and wins a trophy. Mr. Squeal is happy until the fish with the magnet attacks the trophy and swims away as the cartoon ends.

Home media

Looney Tunes Golden Collection: Volume 4, Disc 2 (restored)
The Golden Age of Looney Tunes Volume 2, Side 1 (unrestored)

Notes
This short has a special opening rendition of Merrily We Roll Along.

References

External links

Merrie Melodies short films
Films scored by Carl Stalling
1938 films
1938 animated films
Short films directed by Frank Tashlin
1930s English-language films
1930s American films